Holism is a philosophical concept.

Holism may also refer to:

-holism, a general suffix pertaining to addiction

See also